Ladislav Rybánsky (born 19 December 1984) is a Slovak footballer who plays as a goalkeeper.

Career
Rybánsky began his career 2001 with Spartak Trnava. In 2005, he was loaned to FK Nove Zamky. After one season with FK Nove Zamky, he returned to FC Spartak Trnava, where he started his professional career in the Corgoň Liga in 2008. On 8 July 2010, Rybánsky signed a three-year contract with Kecskeméti TE.

Honours

Kecskeméti TE
Hungarian Cup: 2010–11

References

External links
 

1984 births
Living people
Sportspeople from Šaľa
Slovak footballers
Association football goalkeepers
Slovak Super Liga players
FC Spartak Trnava players
Nemzeti Bajnokság I players
Kecskeméti TE players
BFC Siófok players
Diósgyőri VTK players
Ekstraklasa players
Podbeskidzie Bielsko-Biała players
2. Liga (Slovakia) players
ŠKF Sereď players
Nemzeti Bajnokság II players
Mezőkövesdi SE footballers
Kisvárda FC players
Békéscsaba 1912 Előre footballers
Liga II players
FK Csíkszereda Miercurea Ciuc players
Slovak expatriate footballers
Slovak expatriate sportspeople in Hungary
Expatriate footballers in Hungary
Slovak expatriate sportspeople in Poland
Expatriate footballers in Poland
Slovak expatriate sportspeople in Romania
Expatriate footballers in Romania